Rose-Croix may refer to:

 Rosy Cross, a symbol associated with Christian Rosenkreuz, founder of the Rosicrucian Order
 Rosicrucianism, a spiritual and cultural movement which arose in Europe in the 17th century
 Rose+Croix Journal, a publication of the Ancient Mystical Order Rosae Crucis
 Salon de la Rose + Croix, a series of Symbolist art salons hosted in Paris during the 1890s
 Scottish Rite, one of several Rites of Freemasonry